Ye Olde Cheshire Cheese is a Grade II listed public house at 145 Fleet Street, on Wine Office Court, City of London. Rebuilt shortly after the Great Fire of 1666, the pub is known for its literary associations, with its regular patrons having included Charles Dickens, G.K. Chesterton and Mark Twain.

The pub is on the Campaign for Real Ale's National Inventory of Historic Pub Interiors.

Age

Ye Olde Cheshire Cheese is one of a number of pubs in London to have been rebuilt shortly after the Great Fire of 1666. There has been a pub at this location since 1538. While there are several older pubs which have survived because they were beyond the reach of the fire, or like The Tipperary on the opposite side of Fleet Street because they were made of stone, this pub continues to attract interest due to the lack of natural lighting inside.

Some of the interior wood panelling is nineteenth century, some older, perhaps original. The vaulted cellars are thought to belong to a 13th-century Carmelite monastery which once occupied the site. The entrance to this pub is situated in a narrow alleyway and is very unassuming, yet once inside visitors will realise that the pub occupies a lot of floor space and has numerous bars and gloomy rooms. In winter, open fireplaces are used to keep the interior warm. In the bar room are posted plaques showing famous people who were regulars.

The pub is currently owned and operated by the Samuel Smith Brewery.

Literary associations

The literary figures Oliver Goldsmith, Mark Twain, Alfred Tennyson, Sir Arthur Conan Doyle, G.K. Chesterton, P. G. Wodehouse and Samuel Johnson are all said to have been 'regulars'. However, there is no recorded evidence that Johnson ever visited the pub, only that he lived close by, at 17 Gough Square. At The Johnson Club supper, 13 December 1892, 'an eloquent gentleman, present, an Irish former MP, pointed out that when Johnson acted on his suggestion "let us take a walk down Fleet Street" the Cheshire Cheese must of necessity have been included among his places of call.'

A 1680 broadside ballad called A New Ballad of the Midwives Ghost tells a fantastical story of how a midwife haunted the house where she died until she was able to induce the new residents there to dig up the bones of some bastard children she had made away with and buried there. The final lines of the ballad insist upon the veracity of the tale and even that the children's bones may be seen for proof displayed at the Cheshire Cheese.

Charles Dickens had been known to use the establishment frequently, and it is alluded to in his A Tale of Two Cities: following Charles Darnay’s acquittal on charges of high treason, Sydney Carton invites him to dine, "drawing his arm through his own" Carton leads him to Fleet Street "up a covered way, into a tavern … where Charles Darnay was soon recruiting his strength with a good plain dinner and good wine". R. L. Stevenson mentions the Cheese in The Dynamiter (1885), 'a select society at the Cheshire Cheese engaged my evenings.' A Tale of Two Cities was in part the inspiration for the American children's book The Cheshire Cheese Cat by Carmen Agra Deedy, Randall Wright and Barry Moser, which is set in the pub.

The Cheshire Cheese pub appears in Anthony Trollope's novel Ralph the Heir, where one of the characters, Ontario Moggs, is described as speaking "with vigor at the debating club at the Cheshire Cheese in support of unions and the rights of man..."

Wodehouse, though so many of his characters were members of posh London clubs, often preferred the homey intimacy of the pub. In a letter to a friend he wrote, "Yesterday, I looked in at the Garrick at lunchtime, took one glance of loathing at the mob, and went off to lunch by myself at the Cheshire Cheese." The pub is mentioned by name in some of his books as well.

The Rhymers' Club was a group of London-based poets, founded in 1890 by W. B. Yeats and Ernest Rhys. Originally not much more than a dining club, it produced anthologies of poetry in 1892 and 1894. They met at the Cheshire Cheese and in the 'Domino Room' of the Café Royal.

R. Austin Freeman in his 1913 novel The Mystery of 31 New Inn describes a luncheon at the pub in some detail, including mention of the beef-steak pudding and 'the friendly portrait of the "great lexicographer" [Johnson] that beamed down...from the wall'.

According to the Betty Crocker cookbook, both Dickens and Ben Jonson dined on Welsh rarebit at this pub, although Jonson died almost a century before the dish is first known to have been recorded.

Soviet writer Boris Pilnyak visited the pub during his stay in London in 1923. He later wrote a story entitled "Staryi syr," ("old cheese" in Russian) a part of which takes place in the Cheshire Cheese Pub. There is a chapter devoted to the Cheshire Cheese and the 'Companions of the Cheshire Cheese' (W. B. Yeats' poem The Grey Rock 1914) in That Irishman: The Life and Times of John O'Connor Power by Jane Stanford.

Agatha Christie wrote that her fictional detective Hercule Poirot dined with a new client at the Cheshire Cheese in her 1924 story The Million Dollar Bond Robbery, adding a description of "the excellent steak and kidney pudding of the establishment."

The founding meeting of the Medical Journalists' Association took place at the 'Cheese' on 1 February 1967. At that time, health journalism was in its infancy, and medical doctors who wrote articles under their own name could be reported to the General Medical Council. From an initial membership of 48, the MJA now represents around 500 journalists, broadcasters and editors.

Alexander Theroux's story "An English Railroad" is set in the Cheshire Cheese.

Polly the Parrot
For around 40 years, Ye Olde Cheshire Cheese was associated with a grey parrot named Polly. On its death in 1926 around 200 newspapers across the world wrote obituaries, while the news was read out on radio station 2LO.

Erotic tiles
In 1962, the pub gave the Museum of London a number of sexually explicit erotic plaster of Paris tiles recovered from an upper room. These tiles strongly suggest that the room was used as a brothel in the mid-eighteenth century.

References

 Campaign for Real Ale (CAMRA), The Regional Inventory for London, Pub Interiors of Special Historic Interest.

Further reading

 That Irishman: The Life and Times of John O'Connor Power, Part Three, 'At Large', Jane Stanford, The History Press, 2011,

External links

Ye Olde Cheshire Cheese Review by City Pubs
Review by Party Earth

1538 establishments in England
Grade II listed pubs in the City of London
National Inventory Pubs
Tourist attractions in the City of London